Yerson may refer to:

Yerson Candelo (born 1992), Colombian footballer
Yerson Chacón (born 2003), Venezuelan footballer
Yerson Gutiérrez (born 1994), Colombian footballer
Yerson Mosquera (born 2001), Colombian professional footballer
Yerson Opazo (born 1984), Chilean footballer